Abacetus carinifer is a species of ground beetle in the subfamily Pterostichinae. It was described by Herbert Edward Andrewes in 1942.

References

carinifer
Beetles described in 1942